Outlaw Women is a 1952 American Western film directed by Sam Newfield and Ron Ormond and starring Marie Windsor, Richard Rober and Carla Balenda. It is set in a remote small town run entirely by women. The film was made in Cinecolor and released by the low-budget specialist Lippert Pictures.

Plot

Cast
 Marie Windsor as Iron Mae McLeod  
 Richard Rober as Woody Callaway  
 Carla Balenda as Beth Larabee  
 Jackie Coogan as Piute Bill 
 Allan Nixon as Dr. Bob Ridgeway  
 Jacqueline Fontaine as Ellen Larabee  
 Billy House as Uncle Barney  
 Richard Avonde as Frank Slater  
 Lyle Talbot as Judge Roger Dixon  
 Maria Hart as Dora  
 Leonard Penn as Sam Bass 
 Tom Tyler as Chillawaka Charlie  
 Lou Lubin as Danny  
 Cliff Taylor as Old Barfly  
 The Four Dandies as Saloon Quartet  
 Connie Cezon as One of Uncle Barney's Girls  
 Paula Hill as One of Uncle Barney's Girls  
 Sandy Sanders as Curly  
 Diane Fortier as One of Uncle Barney's Girls  
 Angela Stevens as One of Uncle Barney's Girls  
 Hazel Nilsen as One of Uncle Barney's Girls  
 Clark Stevens as Henchman  
 Riley Hill as John Ringo

Production
The film was the first production of Howco.

References

Bibliography
 Pitts, Michael R. Western Movies: A Guide to 5,105 Feature Films. McFarland, 2012.

External links
 
 

1952 films
1952 Western (genre) films
1950s English-language films
American Western (genre) films
Lippert Pictures films
Cinecolor films
Films directed by Sam Newfield
Films directed by Ron Ormond
1950s American films